Felipe Francisco Macedo (born 27 March 1994) is a Brazilian footballer who plays as a centre-back. He is a free agent.

Club career 
Born in São Miguel do Araguaia, Goiás, Felipe Macedo graduated with Goiás' youth setup and made his senior debuts while on loan at Aparecidense. On 3 October 2013, he made his first team – and Série A – debut for the latter, coming on as a first-half substitute in a 1–2 away loss against Vitória.

In 2014, Felipe Macedo was made a starter by manager Ricardo Drubscky. On 26 February 2015, he renewed his link with the club, signing until 2019.

References

External links 
Felipe Macedo at playmakerstats.com (English version of ogol.com.br)

1994 births
Sportspeople from Goiás
Living people
Brazilian footballers
Association football defenders
Goiás Esporte Clube players
Associação Atlética Aparecidense players
Portimonense S.C. players
F.C. Penafiel players
S.C. Covilhã players
PAEEK players
Campeonato Brasileiro Série A players
Campeonato Brasileiro Série D players
Campeonato Brasileiro Série B players
Primeira Liga players
Liga Portugal 2 players
Cypriot First Division players
Brazilian expatriate footballers
Expatriate footballers in Portugal
Brazilian expatriate sportspeople in Portugal
Expatriate footballers in Cyprus
Brazilian expatriate sportspeople in Cyprus